Hushe Valley is a valley in Ghanche District, Gilgit-Baltistan, Pakistan. Formed by the Hushe River, the valley runs from Masherbrum Mountain (at 7,821 meters) and nearby glaciers south to the Shyok River, opposite Khaplu. Hushe village lies in the center of the valley.

The valley is known for the surrounding high mountains of the Karakoram range, including several peaks above six thousands meters like Laila Peak, K6, and K7. Murtaza peak is 5100m just behind K6 base camp and is considered epicenter of trackers and beginners.

There are many sub-valleys in the area, including Gondogor (see Gondogoro Pass), Charkusa, Nagma, Nanbroq and Mashabrum.

References

External links 

Valleys of Gilgit-Baltistan
Ghanche District